is a Japanese manga written and illustrated by Kou Yoneda. No Touching At All was serialized in the quarterly  manga magazine Craft from 2007 to 2008. The book was followed up with a one-volume sequel spin-off titled . A live-action film adaptation of No Touching At All was released on May 31, 2014.

Plot

On the first day of his new job, Toshiaki Shima becomes trapped in an elevator with a hungover man, who turns out to be his new boss, Yosuke Togawa. Togawa's brash and flippant behavior irritates Shima, but he soon becomes drawn to him when Togawa becomes supportive of him. However, Shima is reluctant to act on his feelings after his previous relationship with a male co-worker, which resulted in him quitting after his workplace discovered his secret. Meanwhile, Togawa must confront the traumatic past of his family.

Characters

 (drama CD); portrayed by: Kosuke Yonehara (film)
Shima is a 26-year-old office employee who identifies as gay. He was ostracized by his previous co-workers after they discovered he was in a relationship with another male colleague, and because of this, he keeps to himself.

 (drama CD); portrayed by: Masashi Taniguchi (film)
Togawa is a 29-year-old section manager and Shima's boss, who is also straight. While brash and outspoken, he is seen as friendly and reliable by his peers, and he acts as Shima's confidant. As a child, his family died from a fire.

 (drama CD); portrayed by: Sho Tomita (film)
Onoda is a 28-year-old office employee and Shima's co-worker, who eventually gets promoted to section manager after Togawa is transferred. He is supportive towards Shima and questions himself when he falls in love with him. After accepting Shima and Togawa's relationship, he starts falling in love with his friend, Deguchi, and they begin a relationship.

Media

Manga

No Touching At All is written and illustrated by Kou Yoneda. It was serialized in the quarterly magazine anthology Craft from 2007 to 2008. The chapters were later released in one bound volume by Taiyoh Tosho under the Million Comics Craft Series imprint. In October 2009, Digital Manga Publishing announced at Yaoi-Con that they were distributing the book in English under the Juné imprint. A drama CD adaptation by B's-Garden, a division of Taiyoh Tosho, was released on March 27, 2009.

Sequel

The series was followed up with a one-volume spin-off titled , which focused on side characters Onoda and Deguchi. In 2014, Digital Manga Publishing distributed the book in English under the Juné imprint and also reprinted No Touching At All to help readers understand the story's background. A drama CD adaptation was released on October 31, 2014.

Film adaptation
In January 2014, vol. 59 of Craft announced a live-action film adaptation starring Kosuke Yonehara from Run&Gun and Masashi Taniguchi. The film was directed by Chihiro Amano as her first feature film, with the script supervised by Natsuko Takahashi. The film was shot in five days. It was released on May 31, 2014. The film was released on DVD and Blu-ray on October 21, 2015, with a special CD featuring artwork by Kou Yoneda.

Reception
No Touching At All was ranked #3 as one of the best boys love stories in Kono BL ga Yabai! 2009 Fujoshi Edition.

References

External links
 Official film adaptation website
 

Digital Manga Publishing titles
Drama anime and manga
Japanese radio dramas
Live-action films based on manga
LGBT in anime and manga
Manga adapted into films
Romance anime and manga
Yaoi anime and manga
2000s LGBT literature
Japanese LGBT-related films
Gay-related films
Japanese romantic drama films
2014 LGBT-related films
LGBT-related romantic drama films